"The Rambling Gambler" is a traditional folk song of the American West. It was first recorded in print by John A. & Alan Lomax in their jointly authored 1938 edition of Cowboy Songs and Other Frontier Ballads. Like many folk songs, it is known by a variety of titles, such as "Rambler, Gambler," and "I'm a Rambler, I'm a Gambler"

The song begins with the lines "I'm a rambler, I'm a gambler, I'm a long way from home / And the people who don't like me, they can leave me alone." Its lyrics mention two towns in Texas, Belton and Saline, as well as the state of Wyoming.

History
John Lomax did not include the song in his original 1910 edition of Cowboy Songs and Other Frontier Ballads, but it appears in the 1938 edition, co-authored with his son Alan. The younger Lomax recorded that they learned the song from one Alec Moore, whom he described as a "retired cowpuncher … whose present occupation is riding herd on an ice-cream wagon on the streets of Austin, Texas."

Alan Lomax recorded his own rendition for his 1958 LP Texas Folksongs (Tradition Records, TLP1029).

In September 1960, 19-year-old Bob Dylan recorded the song — his second-earliest known solo recording session. The recording can be found (titled "Rambler, Gambler") on The Bootleg Series Vol. 7: No Direction Home: The Soundtrack.

Joan Baez performed the song live in the early 1960s; a 1963 recording is included in some editions of Joan Baez in Concert, Part 2; her 1989 album Speaking of Dreams included a medley of the song, paired with The Del-Vikings' "Whispering Bells", performed with Paul Simon.

Other notable performers to have recorded the song include Odetta (as "Rambler-Gambler"), Simon & Garfunkel (as "Rose of Aberdeen"), Flatt & Scruggs, Gordon Bok (as I'm a Rambler, I'm a Gambler"), Ian & Sylvia (as "Rambler Gambler"), and Sandy & Caroline Paton (as "I'm a Rambler and a Gambler"). The Clancy Brothers' song "The Moonshiner" incorporates significant elements of the song, including the chorus.

External links 
A version sung by the Irish rovers

References

American folk songs
Bob Dylan songs
Linda Ronstadt songs
Year of song unknown